The 2020–21 Southampton F.C. season was the club's 104th season in existence and the club's 9th consecutive season in the top flight of English football. In addition to the domestic league, Southampton participated in the season's editions of the FA Cup, and the EFL Cup.

Squad

 Ages as of the end of the 2020–21 season

|}

Transfers
Players transferred in

Players loaned in

Players transferred out

Players loaned out

Players released

Pre-season and friendlies

Competitions

Overview

Premier League

League table

Results summary

Results by matchday

Matches
The 2020–21 season fixtures were released on 20 August.

FA Cup

The third round draw was made on 30 November 2020, with Premier League and EFL Championship all entering the competition. On 7 January 2021, Southampton's third round tie with Shrewsbury Town was postponed following a number of positive COVID-19 tests within the Shrewsbury squad, with the game re-arranged for 19 January. The draw for the fourth and fifth rounds was made, live on BT Sport by Peter Crouch on 11 January. The draw for the quarter finals was made, live on BT Sport by Karen Carney on 11 February. The draw for the semi-finals was made, live on BBC One by Dion Dublin on 21 March.

EFL Cup

The draw for both the second and third round were confirmed on 6 September, live on Sky Sports by Phil Babb.

Squad statistics

Most appearances

Top goalscorers

Notes

References

External links

Southampton F.C. seasons
Southampton F.C.